Ingomar is an unincorporated community in Preble County, in the U.S. state of Ohio.

History
Ingomar had its start around 1886 when the railroad was extended to that point. A post office was established at Ingomar in 1889, and remained in operation until 1958.

References

Unincorporated communities in Preble County, Ohio
Unincorporated communities in Ohio